Parmotrema acrotrychum is a species of lichen in the family Parmeliaceae. First discovered in Papua New Guinea, it was originally described in 1979 by Japanese lichenologist Syo Kurokawa as a species of Parmelia. Heinar Streimann transferred it to the genus Parmotrema in 1986. The lichen has also been found in Queensland (Australia) and Malaysia. It has been shown to contain a variety of secondary chemicals, including atranorin, fumarprotocetraric acid, succinprotocetraric acid, chloroatranorin, protocetraric acid, protolichesterinic acid, and lichesterinic acid.

See also
List of Parmotrema species

References

acrotrychum
Lichen species
Lichens described in 1979
Lichens of Australia
Lichens of New Guinea
Lichens of Malaysia
Taxa named by Syo Kurokawa